"Heartlight" is a song written by Neil Diamond, Carole Bayer Sager and her then-husband Burt Bacharach, and recorded by Diamond in 1982. It is the first track on Diamond's 1982 album, also titled Heartlight, and reached number five on the Billboard Hot 100, becoming his thirteenth (and last) top 10 hit on the chart. It also spent four weeks atop the adult contemporary chart in late 1982, and was the last of his eight #1s on that chart. Reportedly, the song was inspired by the 1982 film E.T. the Extra-Terrestrial, and Diamond allegedly settled with MCA/Universal for $25,000, due to the song's supposedly drawing on the material of the film.

Cash Box said that the song "will unquestionably stick in the minds of adult pop and A/C listeners like a piece of ear candy."  Billboard described it as a "pretty, romantic ballad with a light, lilting melodyline."

Personnel
 Burt Bacharach – orchestra arrangements and conductor
 Paulinho da Costa – percussion
 Neil Diamond – lead vocals, guitar (uncredited)
 David Foster – piano
 Craig Hundley – synthesizer
 Jim Keltner – drums
 Richard Page – backing vocals
 Linda Press – backing vocals
 Stephanie Spruill – backing vocals
 Neil Stubenhaus – bass guitar
 Julia Tillman Waters – backing vocals
 H.L. Voelker – backing vocals
 Marty Walsh – guitar
 Maxine Waters Willard – backing vocals

Chart performance

Weekly charts

Year-end charts

See also
List of number-one adult contemporary singles of 1982 (U.S.)

References

External links
Songfacts - Heartlight by Neil Diamond
 

1982 singles
Neil Diamond songs
Songs with music by Burt Bacharach
Songs written by Carole Bayer Sager
Songs written by Neil Diamond
1982 songs